Richard Aaron Hortness (born 23 May 1985) is a Canadian former competition swimmer. He swam in the 50-metre freestyle at the 2008 Summer Olympics in Beijing, China, and was part of the Canadian 4 × 100 m freestyle team at the 2012 Summer Olympics in London. He currently teaches at South Delta Secondary School in Tsawwassen, Delta, Canada.

References

External links
 http://www.richardhortness.com/p/who-is-richard-hortness.html

1985 births
Living people
Canadian male freestyle swimmers
Commonwealth Games competitors for Canada
Olympic swimmers of Canada
Swimmers at the 2008 Summer Olympics
Swimmers at the 2010 Commonwealth Games
Swimmers at the 2012 Summer Olympics
Swimmers from London, Ontario
UNLV Rebels men's swimmers
Universiade medalists in swimming
Universiade silver medalists for Canada
Medalists at the 2007 Summer Universiade
20th-century Canadian people
21st-century Canadian people